Regina Silva Silveira (born 1939) is a Brazilian artist known for her work with light, shadows and distortions exploring ideas of reality. Silveira has used many media throughout her career but focuses mainly on videography, painting, and printmaking (including some lithography.) She is based in São Paulo.

Early life
Silveira was born in 1939 in Porto Alegre, Brazil, but has spent much of her life in the city of São Paulo. She began studying art in 1950 under Brazilian painter Iberê Camargo; she studied lithography and woodcut in addition to painting. In the 1970s, she began experimenting with printmaking and video.

Education
Regina graduated in 1958 with a degree in fine arts from the Arts Institute of the Universidade Federal do Rio Grande do Sul. Occupying a teaching position in the same institution, she developed a sculpture and painting practice under the tutelage of Iberê Camargo, Francisco Stockinger and Marcelo Grassmann. In 1967 she was awarded a scholarship to study art history in Madrid. She returned to Brazil in 1973, continuing her studies at University of São Paulo's School of Communication and Arts, completing her Master of Fine Arts degree in 1980 and a PhD from the same institution in 1984.

Employment
Regina Silveira held positions at many universities throughout her career. The first was at the Arts Institute of the Universidade Federal do Rio Grande do Sul, an institution from which she graduated with her Bachelor of Fine Arts from 1964 until 1969. From there she took a position at the  University of Puerto Rico on the Mayagyeaz Campus from 1969 for four years until 1973 when she accepted a position at the Fundação Armando Alvares Penteado (FAAP-SP). She kept this position for just over ten years from 1973 until 1985 when she once again found a new employment opportunity. Silveira retired after a lengthy career from the Department of Plastic Arts from the School of Communications and Arts at the Universidade de São Paulo.

Silveira has recently become involved in virtual reality, has made two collaborative works, Infinities and Odisseia.

At one point she had the need to change the form of creation of her forms, going from something analogous to digital, starting with the work Encuentro (1991) since she needed to make a piece on a larger scale than normal and was looking for a greater precision in this, and this was achieved by designing with a digital medium.

In his career she has investigated the perception of reality and what motives have visual images. Her artistic terminology contains different modes of representation in perspective, which circumscribe Skiagraphia (it is the study of shadows) and obtaining them from common objects to create duality and tension.

Work: themes and processes
Silveira established herself as an artist during under the military dictatorship in the 1970s, creating ephemeral conceptual works such as videos, pamphlets and mail art. She "subverted expected meanings through paradox and enigma with the aim of destabilizing perception". In the 1980s  she begins working with skiagraphia (shadow art) in installations, creating "a disorienting experience that highlights the space between presence and absence".

Her art images use installation printmaking in conceptual ways. Silveira's early paintings were site-specific on walls, which then developed into illusions that incorporate digitally produced images in walls and rooms. Silveira has used printmaking to explore the impact of distortion with confrontational shadow images.

Silveira's work centers around the idea that there is a tension between movement and the spatial perspective of an individual, which allows her to interpret her ideas and themes in whatever format she chooses; sometimes she likes to tie in political connotations in order to give a deeper meaning to her work.

In Absentia (1983), was presented at the 17th Biennial in São Paulo. The work, two silhouettes of two of Marcel Duchamp's "readymades" filled the room with shadows in deformed perspectives missing the source of the objects with empty pedestals.  
 
Silveira's visual vocabulary explores the Simulacros between absence and presence using shadows, footprints, and tire tracks.
  
Silveira has had many international installations. She is known for her novel uses of museum and gallery spaces and for her installations in empty office spaces in Houston, Texas.  Furthermore, not only does she experiment with the idea of space and how it is perceived, she also works with light, and the absence of light (shadow.)Her exploration of shadow and light and how that relates to objects are implied and engulfing to the viewer. She likes how shadows are intangible and therefore are in nature a very moldable part of her work that can be intentionally distorted and allow a certain image to only be viewed when looked at from a unique angle. She  likes the ideas related to whether something is present or absent from a scene as well. Desaparencia, from YEAR, literally depicts an easel and stool using dotted lines which is supposed to indicate that although they are present as the piece of art, they are not actually present in the scene, leading to an interesting dichotomy for the viewer.

Silveira is represented by the Sicardi Gallery in Houston, Texas. She resides and works in São Paulo, Brazil.

Solo exhibitions

 
Regina Silveira also took part in many group exhibitions such as the Bienal de São Paulo (1981, 1983, 1994, 1998), the Havana Biennial (Cuba, 1984, 1994, 2015); Brazil: Body and Soul, Guggenheim Museum (New York, 2001); the XV  (Vila Nova de Cerveira, Portugal, 2009); Philagrafika (Philadelphia, 2010); and the XI Biennial of Cuenca (Ecuador, 2011).

Notable exhibitions
Regina Silveira has hosted and contributed to over 100 exhibitions throughout her illustrious career.

Lumen is a favorite of many. Silveira took an entire glass-building and she placed a vinyl lightbulb on the façade which was dark during the day, but had the ability to light up at night. She also utilized blue glass additions which caused the building to have a very different look than its original style, and it also managed to cast shadows and patterns onto the floor which was exactly what Regina Silveira wanted.

Gone Wild is an exhibition which featured animal paw prints in vinyl pasted on the walls. The paw prints appear as though they begin on the floor in amorphous shapes and lead onto the walls as if an animal were actually running around the room. Many of the prints are distorted so that they can only be viewed as a 'normal' paw print when viewed from a certain angle.

Desaparencia is a piece that is set in a barren white-walled room with cedar flooring. The walls have windows, but they are closed so they add little to the effect of the piece. Silveira took latex and using dotted lines, she outlined an artist's easel holding a piece of canvas, with a stool by its side. The easel and the stool extend from the floor (the picture of the piece makes it appear that it may be from the door or from the point of view representing the feet of the viewer) up onto the walls and towards the ceiling. It looks much larger than life, while at the same time very normal. Although it extends from beyond the bottom of the wall all the way towards the ceiling, if looked at from the correct position, it would seem to appear a very regular size.

In Mil E Um Dias, Silveira painted two scenes on a plain wall which also included a doorway and stairs. The two scenes included one night sky dotted with stars, and the other is a picture of a cloudy morning with sunlight peeking through. The door seems to seamlessly blend in with the walls, and the only architecture which draws the eyes of the viewers away from the actual paintings are the stairs. The stairs appear to be leading into non-existent doorways in the sky. It really leads to a deeper understanding and also a deeper contemplation of the meaning of the piece; it's two-fold really: the wall is the blank canvas of our future and we are always trying to make it up the staircase into what lies ahead.

Mundus Admirabilis features vinyl insects taking over a two-tiered room with white walls. This seems to be a repeating pattern throughout Regina's work – white walls with black vinyl patterns. In this piece, she shows hundreds of larger-than-life insects taking over the entire room. They can be found on the ground, on the walls, and even climbing the ladder to the second floor balcony of the room. Although these insects are crawling between the walls, floors, and on the metal seams throughout the room, when looked at as a whole, they don't seem to be segmented, that is to say they don't look like they are crossing the seams of the walls where they meet the flooring, nor do they appear to break between the steps of the ladder.

Scholarships obtained
1993 Pollock-Krasner Foundation
1994 Fulbright Program

Collections
Celeção Itaú, São Paulo, Brazil
Celeção SECS, São Paulo, Brazil
Contemporary Art, La Jolla, CA, US
 Museum of Contemporary Art San Diego
 Museum of Modern Art, New York
 Pinacoteca do Estado de São Paulo
Foundation for Contemporary Performance Arts, New York, NY, US
Blanton Museum of Art, University of Texas, Austin, TX, US
Museo de Arte Contemporânea de Buenos Aires, Argentina
Museu de Arte Moderna do Rio de Janeiro, Brazil
Museu de Arte Moderna de São Paulo, Brazil
Museo del Barrio, New York, NY, US
Taipei Fine Arts Museum, Taiwan
Queens Museum of Art, New York, NY, US

Awards
In recent years, Regina Silveira has won several awards for her work. This list is not exhaustive, but includes many awards between the years of 1983 and 2013.
 1985 Bolsa de Pesquisa, Conselho Nacional de Pesquisa, Brazil
 1987 Bolsa de Pesquisa, Conselho Nacional de Pesquisa, Brazil 
 1988 Melhor Instalação 1987, Associação Paulista de Críticos de Arte, São Paulo, Brazil Premio Lei Sarney à Cultura Brasileira: Gravura, Brasília, Distrito Federal, Brazil 
 1990 The John Simon Guggenheim Foundation Fellowship 
 1993 Art Studio Grant, The Banff Centre, Banff, Canada Pollock-Krasner Foundation Grant, New York, NY 
 1994 Fulbright Foundation, Washington, DC 
 1996 Civitella Ranieri Foundation Fellowship, Civitella Ranieri Center, Umbertide, Italia 
 2000 Gran Premio Del Grabado Latinoamericano: Medalla de Oro, Primera Bienal Argentina de Gráfica Latinoamericana, Buenos Aires, Argentina Prêmio Cultural Sergio Motta para Arte e Tecnologia, Voto Popular, São Paulo, Brazil 
 2004 Claraluz, Melhor Exposição do Ano, Associação Paulista de Críticos de Arte, São Paulo, Brazil 
 2007 Mundus Admirabilis, Prêmio Bravo de Artes Plásticas, São Paulo, Brazil 
 2011 Tramazul, Great Art Critics Award, São Paulo Art Critics Association, São Paulo, Brazil 
 2012 Award for Life and Work, Brazilian Art Critics Association, Brazil 
 2013 Prêmio pelo conjunto da obra, Prêmio MASP Mercedes-Benz, São Paulo, Brazil

References

External links
 
 

1939 births
Living people
20th-century Brazilian women artists
21st-century Brazilian women artists
21st-century Brazilian artists
Brazilian installation artists
Federal University of Rio Grande do Sul alumni
University of São Paulo alumni